Cecil Bisshopp Harmsworth, 1st Baron Harmsworth LLD (23 September 1869 – 13 August 1948), was a British businessman and Liberal politician. He served as Under-Secretary of State for the Home Department in 1915 and as Under-Secretary of State for Foreign Affairs between 1919 and 1922.

Background
Harmsworth was born at Alexandra Terrace, St John's Wood, London, the third son of Alfred Harmsworth and Geraldine Mary, daughter of William Maffett. He was the younger brother of newspaper proprietors Alfred Harmsworth, 1st Viscount Northcliffe, and Harold Harmsworth, 1st Viscount Rothermere, and the elder brother of Sir Leicester Harmsworth, 1st Baronet, and Sir Hildebrand Harmsworth, 1st Baronet. He also had four other younger brothers and four sisters. He was educated at St Marylebone Grammar School and Trinity College Dublin.

Career
Harmsworth was the Liberal candidate in the 1901 by-election for the North East Lanarkshire constituency, but lost to the Liberal Unionist candidate. He was elected to the House of Commons for Droitwich in 1906, a seat he held until he was defeated at the January 1910 general election. He re-entered the House of Commons as the representative for Luton in a 1911 by-election, and continued to sit for the constituency until 1922. He was Parliamentary Private Secretary to Walter Runciman between 1911 and 1915 and then briefly held office under H. H. Asquith as Under-Secretary of State for the Home Department between February and May 1915. However, he did not serve in the coalition government formed by Asquith in May 1915.

After David Lloyd George became Prime Minister in December 1916, Harmsworth was a member of the Prime Minister's Secretariat between 1917 and 1919 and Under-Secretary of State for Foreign Affairs between 1919 and 1922 in Lloyd George's coalition government. He also served briefly as Acting Minister of Blockade in 1919. In 1939 he was raised to the peerage as Baron Harmsworth, of Egham in the County of Surrey. He became a regular contributor in the House of Lords, making his last speech in June 1945.

Apart from his political career Harmsworth was a director of Amalgamated Press and chairman of Associated Newspapers, founded by his brother Lord Northcliffe. He published Pleasure and Problem in South Africa (1908), Immortals at First Hand (1933) and A Little Fishing Book (1942).

Harmsworth purchased Dr Johnson's House and restored it into a museum open to the public.  He also was an active member of the Sylvan Debating Club, which was founded by his father, and served as its treasurer.

His diaries include social meetings with influential people including suffragists like Agnes Harben and her husband.

Family
Lord Harmsworth married his cousin Emilie Alberta, daughter of William Hamilton Maffett, in 1897. His wife was born in 1873 and died in 1942. Lord Harmsworth survived her by six years and died in August 1948, aged 78. He was succeeded in the barony by his eldest surviving son, Cecil.

Arms

References

External links

 
 Cecil Harmsworth papers at the University of Exeter

1869 births
1948 deaths
Cecil
Liberal Party (UK) MPs for English constituencies
UK MPs 1906–1910
UK MPs 1910–1918
UK MPs 1918–1922
UK MPs who were granted peerages
Barons created by George VI